Blackstonia perfoliata or yellow-wort is a species of flowering plant in the family Gentianaceae found around the Mediterranean Basin, but extending into northwestern Europe.

Description
The leaves are glaucous, opposite and entire, the upper ones perfoliate, being united at the base. The calyx is deeply divided into 6–10 linear lobes or sepals, spirally arranged, free or nearly free from each other at the base and shorter than the corolla. The petals number six to ten and form a short tube. There are six to ten adherent stamens and a two-lobed stigma.

Ecology
This species is found in chalk or limestone turf and on dunes. It flowers from June to October in Britain where it is widespread but not common.
Pathogens affecting B. perfoliata include Peronospora chlorae.

References

Gentianaceae
Flora of Europe
Flora of Lebanon
Taxa named by Carl Linnaeus